Vladimir Ilić (Cyrillic: Bлaдимиp Илић, born 23 March 1982) is a Montenegrin football defender.

Club career
Born in Kotor, SR Montenegro, SFR Yugoslavia, he begin his playing career with FK Takovo where he played until 2006 when he moved to FK Javor Ivanjica.  After playing the first two seasons with Javor in the Serbian First League, the club achieved its promotion to the Serbian SuperLiga in 2008.  After another two seasons with Javor, this time in the national top tier, he moved to another SuperLiga side, FK Jagodina in summer 2010.

Honours
Javor
Serbian First League: 2007–08

Jagodina
Serbian Cup: 2013

References

External sources
 Vladimir Ilić Stats at Utakmica.rs

1982 births
Living people
People from Kotor
Association football central defenders
Serbia and Montenegro footballers
Montenegrin footballers
FK Takovo players
FK Javor Ivanjica players
FK Jagodina players
Serbian SuperLiga players
Montenegrin expatriate footballers
Expatriate footballers in Serbia
Montenegrin expatriate sportspeople in Serbia